Ólafur is a common name in Iceland, derived from the Old Norse Óláfr , meaning "ancestor's relic".

According to Icelandic custom, people are generally referred to by first and middle names and patronyms are used if disambiguation is required.

The name is a frequently given name in Iceland. In 2005, it was the fifth most common male given name after Gunnar and before Einar. A diminutive form is Óli.

Notable Icelanders named Ólafur
Bjarni Ólafur Eiríksson (born 1982), football defender
Guðni Ólafur Guðnason (born 1965), retired basketball player
Ólafur Arnalds (born 1986), modern composer
Ólafur Benediktsson (born 1952), former handball player
Ólafur Egilsson (1564–1639), priest
Ólafur Elíasson (born 1967), Danish-Icelandic artist
Ólafur Friðrik Magnússon (born 1952), former mayor of Reykjavík
Ólafur Garðar Einarsson (born 1932), politician and former minister
Ólafur Gottskálksson (born 1968), retired professional football goalkeeper
Ólafur Guðmundsson, handball player
Ólafur Haukur Símonarson, (born 1947), playwright and novelist
Ólafur Ingi Skúlason (born 1983), footballer and a midfielder
Ólafur Jóhann Ólafsson (born 1962), author
Ólafur Jóhann Sigurðsson (1918–1988), novelist, short story writer and poet
Ólafur Jóhannesson (football manager) (born 1957), football manager and former player
Ólafur Jóhannesson (1913–1984), the fifteenth Prime Minister of Iceland
Ólafur Jónsson (born 1946), former handball player
Ólafur Josephsson, musician, better known by the stage name Stafrænn Hákon
Ólafur Örn Bjarnason (born 1975), football defender
Ólafur Páll Snorrason (born 1982), international footballer
Ólafur Ragnar Grímsson (born 1943), the fifth President of Iceland
Ólafur Stefánsson (born 1973), handball player
Ólafur Stígsson (born 1975), footballer
Ólafur Þór Gunnarsson (born 1977), footballer
Ólafur Þórðarson (footballer) (born 1965), former footballer
Ólafur Thors (1892–1964), former Prime Minister of Iceland on five occasions

See also
Óláfr Leggsson, 13th-century Icelandic skald
Óláfr Þórðarson, Icelandic skald and scholar, born about 1210 and died in 1259
Olaf (disambiguation)

References

Masculine given names
Icelandic masculine given names